Run for Your Wife is a 1983 comedy play by Ray Cooney.

Plot
The story concerns bigamist John Smith, a London cab driver with two wives, two lives and a very precisely planned schedule for juggling them both, with one wife at a home in Streatham and another nearby at a home in Wimbledon.

Trouble brews when Smith is mugged and ends up in hospital, where both of his addresses surface, causing both the Streatham and Wimbledon police to investigate the case. His careful schedule upset, Smith becomes hopelessly entangled in his attempts to explain himself to his two wives and two suspicious police officers, with help from his lazy layabout neighbour upstairs in Wimbledon.

Productions
Cast members have a precise schedule as well with many entrances and exits that create pressure and humour through this adult comedy.

London
Richard Briers and Bernard Cribbins took the lead roles in the original West End theatre production. It had a highly successful nine-year run in various theatres: Shaftesbury Theatre (March to December 1983), Criterion Theatre (December 1983 to March 1989), Whitehall Theatre (March 1989 to May 1990), Aldwych Theatre (May to September 1990) and Duchess Theatre (September 1990 to December 1991).

Original West End cast
Richard Briers as John Smith
Bernard Cribbins as Stanley Gardener
Carol Hawkins as Mary Smith
Helen Gill as Barbara Smith
Peter Blake as DS Troughton
Bill Pertwee as DS Porterhouse
Sam Cox as Reporter
Royce Mills as Bobby Franklyn

New York City
Run for Your Wife opened on Broadway at the Virginia Theatre on March 7, 1989, directed by and starring Ray Cooney himself as taxi driver John Smith, and featuring Kay Walbye as his Wimbledon wife, Hilary Labow as his Streatham wife, Gareth Hunt and Dennis Ramsden as the police sergeants, and Paxton Whitehead as Smith's friend and accomplice. The New York Times theater critic Mel Gussow called the play "burdened with blind alleys, limp jokes, forced puns and troubled entendres," the acting "as ordinary as John Smith is supposed to be" and the staging "mechanical, as characters watch one another watching." The production closed on April 9 after 14 previews and 52 regular performances.

Poland
The first Polish production of Run for Your Wife opened in Warsaw's Teatr Kwadrat in 1992 under the title Mayday, directed by Marcin Sławiński, and starring Wojciech Pokora. It has since had a successful run in other theatres across the country, with several more productions directed by Pokora himself.

Seoul
The South Korean production of Run for Your Wife, under the title Liar, has had an open run in Seoul since 1998, and it is considered one of the most successful performances in Korean theater history. Its sequel, Caught in the Net, also has had an open run in Seoul since 2004, under the title Liar 2.

Paris, France
Run For Your Wife opened at the Théâtre de la Michodière under the title Stationnement Alterné on 6 October 2005 and ran for 267 performances.
French adaptation : Stewart Vaughan and Jean-Christophe Barc
Director : Jean-Luc Moreau

cast 
Eric Metayer as Jean Martin
Roland Marchisio as Gilbert Jardinier
Cécile Arnaud as Mathilde Martin
Diana Frank as Charlotte Martin
Daniel-Jean Colloredo as Inspecteur Treguier
Gérard Caillaud as Inspecteur Pontarlier
Laurent Montagner as the photographer
Didier Constant as Claude Mareuil
The script is published by l'Avant-Scène Théâtre

Lahore
On 26 and 27 November 2016, the play was directed by Faiz Rasool from Independent Theatre Pakistan at Ali Auditorium, Lahore, Pakistan.

Shanghai, China
Form May 13, 2021, Chinese edition of Run for Your Wife opened on XingKongJian NO.7. It is directed by Zhi Chen and Xingfei Chen. Until Oct 2021, the play has been on more than one hundred times.

cast
Hongyuan Cao, Chengyang Huang, Xingbao Li as John Smith
Junyu Guo, Xinye Sun, Ziqiu Wu as Stanley Gardener
Enyu Li, Yihan Liu, Mengyan Zhang as Mary Smith
Xinyi Li, Yufan Wang, Jie Xu, Yiqi Xu, Xiaowan Yu as Barbara Smith
Fangzhou Hu, Fangyi Zeng, Yunzhao Wu as Vincent
Fangzhou Hu, Daqin Lin, Yinuo Tao, Tiancheng Yang as Harry
Jiluo Duan, Daqin Lin, Chengyang Huang as Bobby Franklyn

Films
A film adaptation of Run for Your Wife, co-directed by Ray Cooney and John Luton, was released on 14 February 2013, with both Briers and Cribbins appearing in cameo roles. Upon release the film was savaged by critics and has been referred to as one of the worst films of all time, after it grossed just £602 in its opening weekend at the British box office to its £900,000 budget.

A Polish film adaptation titled Mayday directed by Sam Akina was released in Poland on 10 January 2020. It opened to mixed reviews.

References

External links
 
The Stage review of a November 2007 production at Sonning Mill. Retrieved 2012-03-19.

1983 plays
Black comedy plays
British plays adapted into films
Plays by Ray Cooney
Polygamy in fiction